Patrick Flannery may refer to:

 Paddy Flannery (born 1976), Scottish footballer
 Patrick Flannery (piper) (died 1855), Irish piper
 Patrick Flannery (politician), Kentucky politician

See also 
 Patrick Flanery, American author and academic